The Gates Cambridge Scholarship is an international postgraduate award for students to study at the University of Cambridge. The scholarship is one of the most competitive and prestigious in the world, with around 1.3% of applicants receiving an award in recent years. It is the University's most prestigious scholarship programme for postgraduate students.

The Bill and Melinda Gates Foundation established the Gates Cambridge Scholarships in 2000 with a $210 million donation to support outstanding graduate students' study at the University of Cambridge. The gift is the largest single donation to a British university. Each scholarship covers the cost of a postgraduate degree at the University of Cambridge and includes funding for academic and professional development. More than 2,000 students from more than 110 countries have received the scholarship and more than 200 Gates Cambridge Scholars are studying at any time.

Eligibility and selection criteria

Applicants from any country other than the United Kingdom are eligible to apply for the Gates Cambridge Scholarships. Candidates must apply to pursue one of the following full-time residential degrees at the University of Cambridge:

 Doctor of Philosophy (PhD) 
 Master of Science (MSc), Master of Letters (MLitt), Master of Philosophy (MPhil)
 Other one-year postgraduate course (e.g. LLM, MRes, MASt)

Applicants concurrently apply to a course, college and department and the offer of a Gates Cambridge Scholarship is conditional on the student gaining full placement in each.

The Gates Cambridge Trustees use four criteria to choose Scholars:

Academic excellence: Competitiveness is evaluated through academic transcripts, references, experience and the potential to succeed on the chosen course. A departmental nomination is crucial for demonstrating this criterion;
Choice of course: The Trust seeks Scholars who will have an academically transformative experience at Cambridge. Candidates must demonstrate intellectual superiority and the necessary skills and expertise to complete the course which they have chosen;
A commitment to improving the lives of others: A defining characteristic of Scholars is their deep devotion to improving lives of others as evident by their past, current and future commitment to the societies in which they will live and work;
A capacity for leadership: Candidates must show exceptional leadership elements and a pledge to 'take others with them' as future leaders of their fields and communities.
Generally, each class of Gates Cambridge Scholars is composed of 2⁄3 PhD and 1⁄3 one-year Scholars. The Gates Cambridge Trust uses a three-stage selection process to select its Scholars. The application process begins with prospective students applying to study for an eligible degree at the University of Cambridge, either during the U.S. or the global round. Following the initial application, each academic department at the University of Cambridge ranks and nominates eligible applicants for the scholarship. Departmental nominees are the most academically outstanding applicants for postgraduate studies in the department. The list of departmental nominees is then forwarded to the Gates Cambridge Trust, where it is divided into broad subject areas and passed to the Shortlisting Committees. Each Committee reviews the entirety of a departmental nominee and applies the Gates Cambridge selection criteria to shortlist applicants for interview. All shortlisted candidates are interviewed to assess how they meet all Gates Cambridge criteria and Scholars-Elect are selected only after the interview. In 2021, 73 Scholars were selected from a pool of ~5,400 applicants.

Goals

The aim of the Gates Cambridge programme is to build a global network of future leaders committed to improving the lives of others. Scholars and alumni are already becoming leaders in their fields and contributing to finding solutions to some of the world's most pressing problems.

Gates Cambridge Scholars organizations

In 2002, Gates Cambridge Scholars organized and elected a student committee titled The Gates Scholars' Council. The Council aims to represent the Gates Scholars at Cambridge and to build a scholar community interwoven into the fabric of the university. In cooperation with the Gates Cambridge Trust, the university and various academic and professional organizations, the Scholars' Council organizes a number of academic, social and professional events that have distinguished and built the reputation of the Gates Scholars at Cambridge University. The scholarship is particularly known for its strong academic and social community at Cambridge.

In 2005, the Scholars once again self-organized to create the Gates Scholars Alumni Association, which aims to build upon the friendships and contacts that were first made at Cambridge and to bridge the gap between the different generations of scholars. It is an active and growing organization, with members dispersed all over the world.

Controversies

Criticism of the Bill and Melinda Gates Foundation 
The Bill and Melinda Gates Foundation reduced its investments in non-renewable energy in 2016, after recipients of the Gates Cambridge scholarship had urged the Foundation's trustees to divest from fossil fuels a year earlier.

The Foundation gave Indian Prime Minister Narendra Modi its 2019 Global Goalkeeper Award for the Swachh Bharat Mission and the "progress India has made in providing safe sanitation under his leadership." More than 100 Gates Cambridge Scholars and alumni had condemned the Foundation's decision, following the Indian government's decision to withdraw the special status of the disputed territory of Jammu and Kashmir.

Notable scholars

See also
 Churchill Scholarship at Cambridge University
 Rhodes Scholarship at Oxford University
Clarendon Scholarship at Oxford University
 Yenching Scholarship at Peking University
 Schwarzman Scholarship at Tsinghua University
 Commonwealth Scholarship and Fellowship Plan
 Marshall Scholarship for any university in the United Kingdom
 Mitchell Scholarship for any university in the Republic of Ireland or Northern Ireland
 Knight-Hennessy Scholars at Stanford University
 Jardine Scholarship at University of Oxford and University of Cambridge
The Flinn Scholarship for any university in Arizona

References

External links
 Coverage in the Harvard Crimson

Awards and prizes of the University of Cambridge
Scholarships in the United Kingdom
Bill & Melinda Gates Foundation
Awards established in 2000